Pierre Dorsini (23 April 1934 – 10 January 2023) was a French football player and manager who played as a forward. He played the majority of his career with the now-defunct Toulouse FC, playing in 324 matches and scoring 104 goals.

From 1972 to 1973, he was the manager of Toulouse.

References

1934 births
2023 deaths
Sportspeople from Meurthe-et-Moselle
French footballers
French football managers
Association football forwards
FC Nancy players
Toulouse FC players
Toulouse FC (1937) players